Methastyridone is a centrally acting stimulant, whose mode of action differs from that of classical agents such as d-amphetamine.

References

Anorectics
Stimulants